The Battle of Kirpen Island was a small naval battle fought during the Black Sea campaign of World War I. On 29 November 1915 the German U-boat SM UC-13  was shadowing five Russian merchant ships when she ran aground off the mouth of the Sakarya River in poor weather. Admiral Wilhelm Souchon, the German commander of the Ottoman Navy sent two gunboats to recover the wreck. During the following cruise, the three Russian Derzky-class destroyers Derzky, Gnevny and Bespokoiny encountered the gunboats Taşköprü and Yozgat. In the ensuing combat the Russian gunners fired accurately and quickly sank both of the gunboats off Kefken Island on 10 December 1915.

Order of battle
Ottoman Navy:
Taşköprü, gunboat
Yozgat, gunboat

Russian Navy:
Derzky, destroyer
Gnevny, destroyer
Bespokoiny, destroyer

References

Naval battles of World War I involving Russia
Naval battles of World War I involving the Ottoman Empire
Black Sea naval operations of World War I
Conflicts in 1915
December 1915 events